Napoleon Solomon (born 14 February 1994) is a Swedish runner specialising in the 3000 metres steeplechase. He represented his country at the 2017 World Championships without advancing from the first round.

Originally from Eritrea, he came to Sweden as a thirteen-year-old.

International competitions

Personal bests
Outdoor
800 metres – 1:56.36 (Gävle 2015)
1500 metres – 3:53.05 (Gothenburg 2014)
3000 metres – 8:22.82 (Sollentuna 2013)
5000 metres – 13:52.45 (Rovereto 2018)
10,000 metres – 28:33.33 (London 2018)
10 kilometres – 28:56 (Stockholm 2018)
Half marathon – 1:08:13 (Stockholm 2013)
3000 metres steeplechase – 8:23.54 (Rome 2018)

Indoor
800 metres – 1:59.55 (Sätra 2013)
1500 metres – 3:54.90 (Sätra 2013)
3000 metres – 8:26.06 (Norrköping 2013)

References

1994 births
Living people
Swedish male steeplechase runners
World Athletics Championships athletes for Sweden
Eritrean emigrants to Sweden